Temur Nozadze (born 23 January 1998) is a Georgian judoka.

He is the gold medallist of the 2021 Judo Grand Slam Tbilisi in the -60 kg category.

References

External links
 

1998 births
Living people
Male judoka from Georgia (country)
21st-century people from Georgia (country)